WXII-TV (channel 12) is a television station licensed to Winston-Salem, North Carolina, United States, serving the Piedmont Triad region as an affiliate of NBC. It is owned by Hearst Television alongside Lexington-licensed CW affiliate WCWG (channel 20). WXII-TV and WCWG share studios on Coliseum Drive in Winston-Salem; through a channel sharing agreement, the stations transmit using WXII-TV's spectrum from an antenna on Sauratown Mountain in Stokes County.

History
The station first signed on the air on September 30, 1953 as WSJS-TV. It is the third-oldest surviving television station in North Carolina, behind Charlotte's WBTV and channel 12's rival in the Greensboro market, WFMY-TV. The station at first was owned by a partnership of Piedmont Publishing, publishers of the Winston-Salem Journal and Twin City Sentinel, and Hollywood star Mary Pickford and her husband Charles "Buddy" Rogers. It took its calls from Piedmont Publishing's WSJS radio (600 AM and 104.1 FM, now WTQR), which in turn took them from the newspapers' initials.

Johnny Beckman, an early employee, recalled working at WSJS-TV in those early years:

The station has always been affiliated with NBC. ABC programming was shared (through a secondary affiliation) with WFMY until WGHP (channel 8) signed on in October 1963. The station's operations were originally housed from the basement of the WSJS studios on Spruce Street in Winston-Salem. The first broadcast was of the first game of the 1953 World Series between the New York Yankees and the Brooklyn Dodgers. Channel 12 originally broadcast its signal from an antenna near Kernersville. WSJS-TV opened its new transmitter site atop Sauratown Mountain in 1955. In 1959, Piedmont exercised an option agreement to buy out Pickford and Rogers, and gained complete control of the station. The matter ended up in court when Pickford and Rogers felt that Piedmont had undervalued the amount of their shares, but was eventually resolved in Piedmont's favor.

In 1968, Glenn Scott joined the station at a time when weather reporters "climbed" the Shell Weather Tower, used by TV stations around the United States in the 1950s and 1960s.

Piedmont Publishing was sold to Media General in 1968. By this time, the Federal Communications Commission (FCC) was giving serious thought to barring common ownership of newspapers and broadcast outlets. Gordon Gray, the longtime publisher of both papers, thus formed Triangle Broadcasting to hold onto WSJS-AM-FM-TV. Gray also received the franchise for the city's cable system, Summit Cable. However, soon afterward, the FCC ruled that media companies could not own both a television station and a cable system in the same market. Gray was thus forced to sell WSJS-TV in 1972 to Multimedia, Inc., earning a handsome return on his purchase of the Journal and Sentinel in 1937. The new owners changed the station's call letters to WXII-TV on October 2
(the letters "XII" from "WXII" are the Roman numerals for the station's channel number, "12"). At the time of the call letter change, the station ran a promotional ad parodying the death of Julius Caesar to amplify the Roman numeral theme. Two other stations in the market later switched to Roman numeral call letters (WXLV-TV, channel 45 and WLXI-TV, channel 61; WGSR-LD's previous incarnation also used Roman numerals as WXIV).

Multimedia swapped WXII and WFBC-TV (now WYFF) in Greenville, South Carolina, to Pulitzer in 1983 in exchange for KSDK in St. Louis. Pulitzer sold its entire broadcasting division, including WXII, to Hearst-Argyle Television, now Hearst Television, in 1998.

That same year, Hearst bought WETR (830 AM) and changed its callsign to WXII, and switched it to a news radio format that included audio from some WXII newscasts.

On July 9, 2012, Hearst Television became involved in a carriage dispute with Time Warner Cable, resulting in WXII being pulled from the provider's Piedmont Triad systems and being temporarily replaced with Nexstar Broadcasting Group-owned WBRE-TV from Wilkes-Barre, Pennsylvania; Time Warner opted for such a distant signal like WBRE, as it did not have the rights to carry any NBC affiliate closer in proximity. The substitution of WBRE in place of WXII lasted until July 19, 2012, when Hearst and Time Warner reached a new carriage agreement.

Programming

Syndicated programming
Syndicated programming on WXII-TV includes Live with Kelly and Ryan, Inside Edition, and Entertainment Tonight.

News operation

WXII presently broadcasts 38½ hours of locally produced newscasts each week (with 6½ hours each weekday and three hours each on Saturdays and Sundays).

Long a distant runner-up to WFMY-TV, channel 12's newscast ratings began to increase following a series of severe weather events in the late 1980s and early 1990s. Since then, WXII has regularly traded the number one spot in the ratings with WFMY.

On February 12, 2010, after the opening ceremony of the Winter Olympics, WXII began broadcasting its local newscasts in 16:9 widescreen standard definition, becoming the third station to do so after WGHP and WFMY. In-studio segments and news video was presented in widescreen. For a few months after the switch, weather graphics were still presented in the 4:3 format with blue-colored pillarboxing, but were later upgraded to the 16:9 widescreen format. In 2012, WXII began broadcasting its local newscasts in high definition.

On August 13, 2012, WXII debuted a half-hour 10 p.m. newscast on its MeTV-affiliated subchannel on digital channel 12.2, to compete with the longer-established hour-long 10 p.m. newscast on Fox affiliate WGHP. On March 4, 2013, WXII started simulcasting its weeknight 6:00 p.m. newscast on its former sister radio station, WSJS. The two properties also entered into a news sharing agreement in which members of WSJS's reporting staff provide stories on WXII's newscasts while members of channel 12's news staff would also report for WSJS.

On July 26, 2017, WXII announced that it would move its 10:00 p.m. newscast to its new sister station WCWG beginning July 31 and expanded it to a full hour on weeknights while remain as a half-hour on weekends.

On September 5, 2017, WXII added an hour-long 4:00 p.m. newscast, expanding its early-evening news block to two-and-a-half hours from 4:00-6:30 p.m.

Notable former on-air staff
 John Beard – anchor/reporter (1976–1977); later worked in Los Angeles (KNBC/KTTV) and at WGRZ in Buffalo
 Paul Dellegatto – chief meteorologist (1986–1990); now chief meteorologist at WTVT in Tampa
 Monica Malpass – anchor/reporter (joined WPVI-TV in Philadelphia in 1988)
 Bonnie Schneider – meteorologist (joined CNN in 2005); now with The Weather Channel
 Jennie Stencel – traffic reporter (resigned on May 14, 2010)

Technical information

Subchannels
The station's digital signal is multiplexed:

WXII added This TV on digital subchannel 12.2 on June 1, 2009. On July 24, 2012, Hearst Television renewed its affiliation agreement with MeTV to maintain existing affiliations with eight Hearst-owned stations already carrying the digital multicast network through 2015. As part of the renewal, Hearst also signed agreements to add the network as digital subchannels of WXII-TV and four other stations in Sacramento, Baltimore, Boston, and Oklahoma City. Digital subchannel 12.2 replaced This TV with MeTV on August 6, 2012.

Analog-to-digital conversion
WXII-TV shut down its analog signal on June 12, 2009, as part of the FCC-mandated transition to digital television for full-power stations. The station's digital signal remained on its pre-transition UHF channel 31, using PSIP to display WXII-TV's virtual channel as 12 on digital television receivers.

As part of the SAFER Act, WXII temporarily kept its analog signal on the air to inform viewers of the digital television transition through a loop of public service announcements from the National Association of Broadcasters.

Out-of-market cable and satellite carriage
In recent years, WXII has been carried on cable in areas outside of the Greensboro television market including cable systems within the Charlotte market in North Carolina and the Roanoke market in Virginia. On DirecTV, WXII has been carried in multiple areas within the Roanoke market in Virginia.

CATV
In the 1970s and 1980s, WXII was once carried in Moore and Richmond counties.

References

External links
WXII-TV website

NBC network affiliates
Television channels and stations established in 1953
MeTV affiliates
XII-TV
Hearst Television
1953 establishments in North Carolina